Monte Sobretta is the highest mountain of the Sobretta-Gavia Group in Lombardy, Italy. It has an elevation of

Access roads and normal climbing route
To access the mountain you follow the road towards the Gavia pass, either from Ponte di Legno in the south or from Santa Caterina Valfurva in the north. There is a parking at around 2300 meters above the sea level on the north side of the mountain.

From the parking to the summit you will need around four hours. No special equipment is needed. It is snow free in the summer time, a simple walk up.

References

External links 
 Monte Sobretta in Mountains for Everybody.

Mountains of Lombardy
Mountains of the Alps
Alpine three-thousanders